The M5 is a United States minimum metal plastic cased anti-tank blast mine. The mine uses either a glass or porcelain internal case with a protective outer case. The mine uses a chemical fuse rather than a mechanical one. It contains either 5.4 lb (2.4 kg) of TNT or 5.7 lb (2.6 kg) of tetrytol (a mixture of tetryl and TNT). It was used during the Second World War.

Specifications
 Weight: 15 lb (6.8 kg) or 15.3 lb (6.9 kg) 
 Explosive content: 5.4 lb (2.4 kg) of TNT or 5.7 lb (2.6 kg) of tetrytol
 Diameter: 10 inches (250 mm)
 Height: 5 inches (125 mm)

Anti-tank mines
Land mines of the United States